LME may stand for:

 LME, Inc., a Minnesota-based trucking company
 Labour Movement for Europe, a socialist society affiliated to the UK Labour Party
 Large marine ecosystem
 Late Middle English
 Liquid metal embrittlement, of solid metals in the presence of some liquid metals
 London Metal Exchange, futures exchange, England